Jamila Soraia Martins Marreiros (born 30 May 1988) is a Portuguese football goalkeeper who plays for CF Benfica and the Portugal women's national football team.

Club career

Marreiros is the daughter of a Portuguese father and Angolan mother. She grew up playing futsal for União de Lagos alongside team-mate Cláudia Neto. After switching to 11-a-side, she later played alongside Neto at Spanish Primera División clubs Prainsa Zaragoza and RCD Espanyol. Both players were allowed to leave Espanyol in June 2014.

She returned to Portugal and played for A-dos-Francos in 2014–15. In season 2015–16 CF Benfica secured their second consecutive League and Cup double and their goalkeeper Marreiros was named Campeonato Nacional de Futebol Feminino Goalkeeper of the Year.

International career

Marreiros was named by coach Francisco Neto in the Portugal national team for UEFA Women's Euro 2017, where she understudied Patrícia Morais.

References

External links
 
 
 
 
 Profile at AupaAthletic 

1988 births
Living people
People from Lagos, Portugal
Portuguese women's footballers
Portugal women's international footballers
Women's association football goalkeepers
Portuguese expatriate footballers
Expatriate women's footballers in Spain
Portuguese expatriate sportspeople in Spain
Primera División (women) players
RCD Espanyol Femenino players
Zaragoza CFF players
Portuguese sportspeople of Angolan descent
C.F. Benfica (women) footballers
Campeonato Nacional de Futebol Feminino players
Sportspeople from Faro District
UEFA Women's Euro 2017 players